is a city located in Gifu, Japan. , the village had an estimated population of 54,686 and a population density of 1900 persons per km2, in 20866 households.

Geography
Mizuho is located in south-west Gifu Prefecture in the northwestern part of the Nōbi Plain, sandwiched between the cities of Gifu and Ogaki. The Nagara River and the Ibi River flow through the city. Mizuho is surrounded by the city of Seki to the west, south and east, and by the city of Gujō to the north.

Climate
The city has a climate characterized by characterized by hot and humid summers, and mild winters (Köppen climate classification Cfa).  The average annual temperature in Mizuho is 15.1 °C. The average annual rainfall is 1942 mm with September as the wettest month. The temperatures are highest on average in August, at around 27.9 °C, and lowest in January, at around 4.1 °C.

Neighbouring municipalities
Gifu Prefecture
Cities of Gifu, Ōgaki and Motosu
Towns of Kitagata (Motosu District) and Anpachi and Gōdo (Anpachi District)

Demographics
Per Japanese census data, the population of Mizuho has increased rapidly over the past 50 years.

History
The area around Mizuho was part of traditional Mino Province. During the Edo period, Mieji-juku prospered as a post station: on the Nakasendo highway connecting Edo with Kyoto. Under the Tokugawa shogunate, most of the area of Mizuho was part of Ogaki Domain or was tenryō territory administered by various hatamoto. In the post-Meiji restoration cadastral reforms, Motosu District in Gifu prefecture was created, and with the establishment of the modern municipalities system on July 1, 1889 the town of Kozuchi was created. (both from Motosu District).

Government
Mizuho has a mayor-council form of government with a directly elected mayor and a unicameral city legislature of 18 members.

Education

Universities, Colleges
Asahi University

Primary and secondary education
Mizuho has seven public elementary schools and three public middle schools operated by the city government. The city does not have a high school.

Transportation

Railway
 Central Japan Railway Company - Tōkaidō Main Line

 Tarumi Railway - Tarumi LIne
 -  -

Highway

References

External links

  

 
Cities in Gifu Prefecture